Ezechiel Aliadjim N'Douassel (born 22 April 1988) is a Chadian professional footballer who plays a striker forthe Chad national team. He is also nicknamed "King Eze" and "Giga Chad".

Club career

Early career
N'Douassel began his career in 2006 at local side Tourbillon FC before moving to Algeria in 2007 to play for MC Oran and he joined USM Blida.

USM Blida
In his debut for USM Blida, Ndouassel scored a brace against MC El Eulma, with goals in the 86th and 90th minute to give his team a 2–1 win. He would end the season with five goals in fifteen appearances. During his time at USM Blida, N'Douassel was linked with a number of European clubs including Olympique de Marseille, Arsenal, Monaco and Mallorca. On July 20, 2009, it was announced that Ndouassel joined Belgian club FCV Dender on a free transfer and signed a 3-year contract worth €200,000 after impressing on trial in friendlies against Roeselare and Hamme. However, the move was not finalized and Ndouassel was forced to return to USM Blida shortly after because he was still under contract with the club.

Club Africain
On January 9, 2011, Ndouassel signed a 4-year contract with Tunisian side Club Africain.
In July 2014, Ndouassel was reported to have moved to Paris FC on loan, with an option to buy. However this move fell through due to financial constraints on the French club, and with Club African unwilling to include him in their squad, left Ndouassel looking for a new club.

Ironi Kiryat Shmona
On 4 September 2016 he signed a 3-year contract with Ironi Kiryat Shmona. In January 2017 he left the club.

Persib Bandung
On 7 August 2017, he signed a half year contract with Persib Bandung and retained for the following season. He made his league debut in a 0–0 against Arema on 12 August 2017 as a substitute for Tantan in the 45th minute.
On 20 August 2017, N'Douassel scored his first league goal for Persib against Gresik United as his team won 6–0.

He was also the top scorer for Persib in 2018 season with 17 goals, and retained by the club until 2020. He scored quattrick in a match against PSM Makassar on 22 December 2019.

Bhayangkara 
In January 2020, N'Douassel completed a move to Bhayangkara FC on a 2-year deal.

2020 season
N'Douassel made his debut for Bhayangkara, coming on as a substitute for Herman Dzumafo, in a pre-season cup game against Cambodian C-League club Visakha as his team won 1–0. N'Douassel scored his first goal for Bhayangkara in the same pre-season cup against Malaysia Super League club Petaling Jaya City, scoring a goal in the 55th-minute, which saw Bhayangkara crowned as the champion. On 29 February 2020, N'Douassel made his first league debut for Bhayangkara against Persiraja Banda Aceh as his team drew 0–0. On 31 March 2020 N'Douassel scored his first league goal for Bhayangkara against Persija Jakarta as his team drew 2–2.

2021 season
On 29 August 2021, N'Douassel scored a brace in Bhayangkara's first league match in 2021-22 Liga 1, earning them a 2–1 win over Persiraja Banda Aceh. N'Douassel scored two goals in a 3–2 win against Barito Putera, extending Bhayangkara unbeaten streak to six matches. On the following matchday, he started against his former club Persib Bandung, which ended his team's unbeaten run with a score of 2–0.

International career

Ezechiel is the captain and the national team's most capped player and top scorer in the history. He is a member of the Chad national team since 2005. He played on 2005 CEMAC Cup, 2007 CEMAC Cup, 2008 Africa Cup of Nations qualification in a matches against South Africa home and away, against Zambia and Congo, and in the 2010 World Cup qualification against the Congo home and away, and Sudan and Mali at home. In the 2012 Africa Cup of Nations qualification he played matches against Togo at home, Botswana home and away, Tunisia at home and away, and Malawi both away and at home. He also played the home match against Tanzania, in a 2014 World Cup qualification.

Career statistics

International

Scores and results list Chad's goal tally first.

References

External links
 

1988 births
Living people
Chadian footballers
MC Oran players
USM Blida players
Club Africain players
FC Akhmat Grozny players
Konyaspor footballers
Hapoel Ironi Kiryat Shmona F.C. players
Hapoel Tel Aviv F.C. players
Persib Bandung players
Bhayangkara F.C. players
Tourbillon FC players
NA Hussein Dey players
CS Sfaxien players
Russian Premier League players
Süper Lig players
Israeli Premier League players
Liga 1 (Indonesia) players
Chadian expatriate footballers
Chad international footballers
Expatriate footballers in Algeria
Expatriate footballers in Tunisia
Expatriate footballers in Russia
Expatriate footballers in Turkey
Expatriate footballers in Israel
Expatriate footballers in Indonesia
Chadian expatriate sportspeople in Algeria
Chadian expatriate sportspeople in Tunisia
Chadian expatriate sportspeople in Russia
Chadian expatriate sportspeople in Turkey
Chadian expatriate sportspeople in Indonesia
Association football forwards
People from N'Djamena